The vice president of Iran is defined by article 124 of the Constitution of Iran, as anyone appointed by the president of Iran to lead an organization related to presidential affairs. , there are 12 vice presidents in Iran. The first vice president leads cabinet meetings in the absence of the president.

Vice presidents

First vice president

The role of the first vice president was created in the revision of the Constitution in 1989. It took over some of the responsibilities of the prime minister. According to Article 124, the first vice president chairs the board of ministers and coordinates the other vice presidencies, if let by the president. According to Article 131, the first vice president takes over as acting president in cases where the President in incapacitated, but only if permitted by the supreme leader. According to the same article, the first vice president (or anyone serving as acting president) must make sure that a new president is elected in fifty days.

According to Article 132, during the time an acting president is serving (usually a first vice president), the Majlis cannot impeach ministers and it can't disapprove newly introduced ministers. Also, referendums and revisions to the Constitution are forbidden.

List

Ex-officio vice presidents
Current officeholders are ex officio vice presidents:
 Vice President and Head of Environmental Protection Organization
 Vice President and Head of Atomic Energy Organization
 Vice President and Head of Plan and Budget Organization
 Vice President and Head of Foundation of Martyrs and Veterans Affairs
 Vice President and Head of National Elites Foundation
 Vice President and Head of Administrative and Employment Affairs Organization
Formerly, heads of these two organization below were ex-officio Vice Presidents:
 Vice President and Head of Physical Education Organization
 Vice President and Head of National Youth Organization of Iran
Both organizations were merged into Ministry of Youth Affairs and Sports.
 Vice President and Head of Cultural Heritage, Handcrafts and Tourism Organization
Organization became Ministry of Cultural Heritage, Handcrafts and Tourism Organization.

Optional vice presidents
The President may or may not choose vice presidents for specific issues, but their existence is not obligatory. Some of the offices held by vice presidents are:
 Vice President for Parliamentary Affairs (2009–)
 Vice President for Legal Affairs (2009–)
 Vice President for Executive Affairs (1989–1993; 1994–2001; 2005–2009; 2011–2017; 2021–)
 Vice President for International Affairs (2011–2013)
 Vice President for Economic Affairs (1993–1994; 2017–)
 Vice President for Women and Family Affairs (2013–)
 Vice President for Management and Human Resources Development (2009–2013)
 Vice President for Supervision and Strategic Affairs (2007–2014)
 Vice President for Development and Social Affairs (1998–1999)

Current vice presidents

In popular culture 
 Bodyguard (2016), a drama film written and directed by Ebrahim Hatamikia.

See also
 Chief of Staff of the President of Iran
 Advisor to the President of Iran
 Aide to the President of Iran

References

External links

Lists of vice presidents
Main

fa:معاون اول رئیس‌جمهور ایران